The Hoosier Theatre is a 225-seat historic theatre located at 209 Ferry Street in Vevay, Switzerland County, Indiana. It was built in 1837 as a warehouse and store to serve the town's large Ohio River traffic. Over the years it has housed a saddlery, the local post office, a tavern, the offices of the Vevay Newspaper, and a theatre, which it became in 1926. It was abandoned in 1955 and sat vacant until 1983, when Historic Vevay, Inc., a not-for-profit corporation was formed to purchase and restore the building. It re-opened in 1987 and continues to operate.

It was listed on the National Register of Historic Places in 1982.

References

Theatres on the National Register of Historic Places in Indiana
Commercial buildings completed in 1837
Theatres completed in 1926
Tourist attractions in Switzerland County, Indiana
Buildings and structures in Switzerland County, Indiana
National Register of Historic Places in Switzerland County, Indiana